This is a summary history of diplomatic relations of the United States listed by country. The history of diplomatic relations of the United States began with the appointment of Benjamin Franklin as U.S. Minister to France in 1778, even before the U.S. had won its independence from Great Britain in 1783.

The information is drawn from official records of the United States Department of State. This history encompasses the following information for each nation that the United States has recognized, or with which the U.S. has had diplomatic relations:
Country name
Date of establishment of a consulate in that country, or date of appointment of a consul.
Date on which the U.S. recognized the country.
Date of establishment of diplomatic relations with the country. This is often, but not always, the date of appointment of the first minister or ambassador.
The date on which a legation or embassy was established in the country.
The name of the first minister or ambassador to the country. In many cases, a chargé d’affaires was appointed first and represented the U.S. until an envoy was commissioned.
The date on which diplomatic relations ended between the U.S. and the country.
Additional notes on U.S. diplomatic relations with the country.

Countries

Afghanistan
Consulate:
Recognized: 1921
Relations established: 1935
Legation/embassy established: 1942; embassy established in 1946
First ambassador: William Harrison Hornibrook
Relations ended: —
Notes:
U.S. Ambassador Adolph Dubs was assassinated in 1979.
The U.S. Embassy at Kabul was closed on January 30, 1989, due to concerns that the new regime would not be able protect diplomats after the Soviet withdrawal. Following the ouster of the Taliban, the embassy was reopened in January 2002 with Ryan Crocker as ambassador.

Albania (1)
Consulate:
Recognized: 1922
Relations established: 1922
Legation/embassy established: 1922
First ambassador: Ulysses Grant-Smith
Relations ended: 1939
Notes:
U.S.–Albanian diplomatic relations ended on June 5, 1939, after the Italian invasion of Albania, when the Albanian Minister for Foreign Affairs notified the American Minister in Albania that Italy had taken control of Albania's foreign affairs.

Albania (2)
Consulate:
Recognized: 1991
Relations established: 1991
Legation/embassy established: 1991
First ambassador: William Edwin Ryerson
Relations ended: —

Algeria
Consulate: 1796
Recognized: 1962
Relations established: 1962
Legation/embassy established: 1962
First ambassador: William J. Porter
Relations ended: —
Notes:
Algeria severed diplomatic relations with the U.S. in 1967 in the wake of the 1967 Arab-Israeli war. A U.S. Interests Section was established in the Swiss Embassy. Relations were reestablished in 1974.

Andorra
Consulate:
Recognized: 1995
Relations established: 1995
Legation/embassy established: —
First ambassador: Edward L. Romero (1998)
Relations ended: —
Notes:
The U.S. Ambassador to Spain is also accredited to Andorra while resident in Madrid. There is no U.S. embassy in Andorra.

Angola
Consulate: 1992
Recognized: 1993
Relations established: 1994
Legation/embassy established: 1994
First ambassador: Edmund T. DeJarnette
Relations ended: —
Notes:
Angola became independent of Portugal in 1975, but the U.S. did not recognize the government of Angola declared by the MPLA. The U.S. recognized Angola after multiparty elections were held in 1992.

Antigua and Barbuda
Consulate:
Recognized: 1981
Relations established: 1981
Legation/embassy established: 1981
First ambassador: Milan D. Bish
Relations ended: —
Notes:
The American Embassy at St. Johns was closed June 30, 1994. Subsequent ambassadors to Antigua and Barbuda remained resident at Bridgetown, Barbados.

Arab Federation
Consulate:
Recognized: 1958
Relations established: —
Legation/embassy established: —
First ambassador: —
Relations ended: 1958
Notes:
The Arab Federation was a short-lived union between Iraq and Jordan, that lasted February 14 – August 2, 1958. The U.S. recognized the federation but never established diplomatic relations.

Argentina
Consulate:
Recognized: 1823
Relations established: 1823
Legation/embassy established: 1823
First ambassador: Caesar Augustus Rodney
Relations ended: —
Notes:
Diplomatic relations were interrupted in 1944 and resumed in 1945.

Armenia (1)
Consulate: 1896
Recognized: 1920
Relations established: —
Legation/embassy established: —
First ambassador: Steven Mann (chargé d’affaires)
Relations ended: 1920
Notes:
By the end of 1920, the Armenian Republic had ceased to exist as an independent state, with its territory either seized by Turkey or established as the Armenian Soviet Republic, which subsequently joined the Soviet Union.

Armenia (2)
Consulate:
Recognized: 1991
Relations established: 1992
Legation/embassy established: 1992
First ambassador: Harry J. Gilmore
Relations ended: —

Australia
Consulate:
Recognized: 1940
Relations established: 1940
Legation/embassy established: 1940
First ambassador: Clarence E. Gauss
Relations ended: —

Austrian Empire
Consulate: 1797
Recognized: 1838
Relations established: 1838
Legation/embassy established: 1838
First ambassador: Henry A. Muhlenberg
Relations ended: 1917
Notes:
On April 8, 1917, the Austro-Hungarian Empire severed diplomatic relations with the United States. Several months later, on December 7, 1917, the U.S. declared war upon Austria-Hungary.

Austria
Consulate:
Recognized: 1921
Relations established: 1921
Legation/embassy established: 1921
First ambassador: Albert Henry Washburn
Relations ended: —
Notes:
Relations with Austria were broken in 1938 after the Anschluss and resumed in 1946.

Azerbaijan
Consulate:
Recognized: 1991
Relations established: 1992
Legation/embassy established: 1992
First ambassador: Robert Finn
Relations ended: —

Baden, Grand Duchy of
Consulate: 1832
Recognized: 1832
Relations established: 1832
Legation/embassy established: 1833*
First ambassador: C.F. Hoyer (Consul)
Relations ended: 1917
Notes:
Relations were with the Grand Duchy of Baden were severed in 1917 when the U.S. entered WWI.

Bahamas
Consulate:
Recognized: 1973
Relations established: 1973
Legation/embassy established: 1973
First ambassador: Moncrieff J. Spear
Relations ended: —

Bahrain
Consulate:
Recognized: 1971
Relations established: 1971
Legation/embassy established: 1971
First ambassador: Joseph W. Twinam (1974)
Relations ended: —

Bangladesh
Consulate: 1949
Recognized: 1972
Relations established: 1972
Legation/embassy established: 1972
First ambassador: Davis Eugene Boster
Relations ended: —
Notes:
The consulate in Dhaka was established when Bangladesh was a province of Pakistan known as East Pakistan.

Barbados
Consulate: 1823
Recognized: 1966
Relations established: 1966
Legation/embassy established: 1966
First ambassador: Frederic R. Mann (1967)
Relations ended: —
Notes:
The U.S. consulate in Barbados was established when Barbados was a British colony.

Bavaria
Consulate: 1833
Recognized: 1833
Relations established: 1833
Legation/embassy established: —
First ambassador: Robert de Ruedorffer (Consul)
Relations ended: 1917
Notes:
George Bancroft was the U.S. minister to Prussia and was specially accredited to Bavaria, but was not the official minister.
Relations with Bavaria were severed in 1917 when the U.S. entered WWI.

Belarus
Consulate:
Recognized: 1991
Relations established: 1991
Legation/embassy established: 1992
First ambassador: David Heywood Swartz
Relations ended: —
Notes:
U.S. Ambassador Karen B. Stewart was recalled in 2008.  no ambassador had been appointed.

Belgium
Consulate:
Recognized: 1832
Relations established: 1832
Legation/embassy established: 1832
First ambassador: John Jacob Seibels (1854)
Relations ended: —
Notes:
A series of chargés d’affaires represented the U.S. in Belgium until 1854 when the first ranking minister was appointed.
The United States closed its embassy in Brussels on July 15, 1940, after the German invasion of Belgium. The embassy was reopened September 14, 1944. During the war, relations were maintained with the government-in-exile in London.

Belize
Consulate: 1847
Recognized: 1981
Relations established: 1981
Legation/embassy established: 1981
First ambassador: Malcolm R. Barnebey
Relations ended: —

Benin
Consulate:
Recognized: 1960
Relations established: 1960
Legation/embassy established: 1961
First ambassador: R. Borden Reams
Relations ended: —
Notes:
Ambassador Reams was commissioned to Dahomey, Ivory Coast, Niger, and Upper Volta while resident in Abidjan.
Benin was known as Dahomey until 1975.

Bhutan
Consulate: —
Recognition: —
Diplomatic relations: —
First ambassador: —
Relations ended: —
Notes:
There is no record of U.S. recognition of Bhutan, and the U.S. does not maintain diplomatic relations with Bhutan. The U.S. embassy in New Delhi, India, has consular responsibilities for Bhutan. Informal contact is maintained through the U.S. embassy and the Bhutanese embassy in New Delhi.

Bolivia
Consulate:
Recognized: 1848
Relations established: 1849
Legation/embassy established: 1849
First ambassador: John W. Dana (1854)
Relations ended: —
Notes:
A series of chargés represented the U.S. to Bolivia until the first ranking minister was appointed in 1854.
See also Peru–Bolivia Confederation.

Bosnia and Herzegovina
Consulate:
Recognized: 1992
Relations established: 1992
Legation/embassy established: 1993
First ambassador: Victor Jackovich
Relations ended: —

Botswana
Consulate:
Recognized: 1966
Relations established: 1966
Legation/embassy established: 1966
First ambassador: Charles J. Nelson (1971)
Relations ended: —
Notes:
Until 1979 one ambassador was accredited to Botswana, Swaziland, and Lesotho while resident at Gaborone.

Brazil
Consulate:
Recognized: 1824
Relations established: 1824
Legation/embassy established: 1825
First ambassador: William Hunter (1842)
Relations ended: —
Notes:
A series of chargés represented the U.S. to Brazil until the first ranking minister was appointed in 1842.

Brunei
Consulate: 1865
Recognized: 1984
Relations established: 1984
Legation/embassy established: 1984
First ambassador: Barrington King
Relations ended: —

Brunswick-Lüneburg, Duchy of
Consulate: 1856
Recognized: 1848
Relations established: —
Legation/embassy established: —
First ambassador: —
Relations ended: 1916
Notes:
The United States and the Duchy recognized each other but never established diplomatic relation. The Duchy joined the North German Confederation in 1867 and thus ceased to handle its own foreign affairs.

Bulgaria
Consulate: 1912
Recognized: 1908
Relations established: 1903
Legation/embassy established: 1919
First ambassador: John Ridgely Carter (1910)
Relations ended: —
Notes:
A series of representatives with the title Diplomatic Agent represented the U.S. in Bulgaria until the first ranking minister was appointed in 1910.
The first ministers were accredited to Romania, Serbia, and Bulgaria, while resident at Bucharest, Romania.
Bulgaria severed diplomatic relations with the U.S. in 1941. Relations were reestablished in 1947, and the legation was reopened. Relations were again severed in 1950 and resumed in 1959.

Burkina Faso
Consulate:
Recognized: 1960
Relations established: 1960
Legation/embassy established: 1960
First ambassador: R. Borden Reams
Relations ended: —
Notes:
Burkina Faso was known as Upper Volta Until 1984.
Ambassador Reams was commissioned to Dahomey, Ivory Coast, Niger, and Upper Volta while resident in Abidjan.

Burma
Consulate:
Recognized: 1948
Relations established: 1947
Legation/embassy established: 1947
First ambassador: J. Klahr Huddle
Relations ended: —
Notes:
In 1989 the government of Burma changed the name of the country to Myanmar, but the U.S. and other nations do not recognize the legitimacy of the government and hence the change of name.

Burundi
Consulate:
Recognized: 1962
Relations established: 1962
Legation/embassy established: 1962
First ambassador: Donald A. Dumont
Relations ended: —

Cambodia
Consulate:
Recognized: 1950
Relations established: 1950
Legation/embassy established: 1950
First ambassador: Donald R. Heath
Relations ended: —
Notes:
Cambodia severed diplomatic relations with the U.S. in 1965 and restored relations in 1969. Relations were again broken in 1975 and reestablished in 1991.

Cameroon
Consulate:
Recognized: 1960
Relations established: 1960
Legation/embassy established: 1960
First ambassador: Leland Barrows
Relations ended: —

Canada
Consulate:
Recognized: 1927
Relations established: 1927
Legation/embassy established: 1927
First ambassador: William Phillips
Relations ended: —
Notes:
Until 1926 Canada was a part of the British Empire, with its foreign relations managed by the British Foreign Office.

Cape Verde
Consulate:
Recognized: 1975
Relations established: 1975
Legation/embassy established: 1978
First ambassador: Melissa F. Wells (1976)
Relations ended: —
Notes:
Until 1983 one ambassador was accredited to Guinea-Bissau and Cape Verde while resident at Bissau. In 1983 the first ambassador was appointed solely accredited to Cape Verde.

Central African Republic
Consulate:
Recognized: 1960
Relations established: 1960
Legation/embassy established: 1961
First ambassador: W. Wendell Blancke
Relations ended: —
Notes:
Ambassador Blancke was commissioned to the Central African Republic, Chad, the Republic of the Congo, and Gabon, while resident in Brazzaville.

Central America, Federal Republic of
Consulate:
Recognized: 1824
Relations established: 1824
Legation/embassy established: 1826
First ambassador: John Williams
Relations ended: 1840
Notes:
The Federal Republic of Central America (República Federal de Centroamérica) was a short-lived union of the present-day states of Guatemala, El Salvador, Honduras, Nicaragua, and Costa Rica. Later Los Altos was added, with its capital in Quetzaltenango – occupying parts of what are now the western highlands of Guatemala and Chiapas state in southern Mexico. The federation was founded in 1823, effectively dissolved in 1840, and formally ended in 1841.
The federation dissolved by 1840, although the last diplomatic agent, William Sumter Murphy, did not leave his post until 1842.
Between 1844 and 1853, the U.S. government recognized the individual members of the federation.

Chad
Consulate:
Recognized: 1960
Relations established: 1960
Legation/embassy established: 1961
First ambassador: W. Wendell Blancke
Relations ended: —
Notes:
Ambassador Blancke was commissioned to the Central African Republic, Chad, the Republic of the Congo, and Gabon, while resident in Brazzaville.
The U.S. Embassy N'Djamena was closed 1980–82 due to war, although diplomatic relations were not broken.

Chile
Consulate:
Recognized: 1823
Relations established: 1824
Legation/embassy established: 1824
First ambassador: Heman Allen
Relations ended: —

China
 see History of China–United States relations to 1948
 see China–United States relations for recent history
Consulate:
Recognized: 1844
Relations established: 1844
Legation/embassy established: 1844
First ambassador: Caleb Cushing
Relations ended: —
Notes:
1949: The U.S. embassy moved to Taipei, Formosa, when the Nationalist government of China fled to Formosa.
1973: The U.S. Liaison Office opened in Beijing.
1979: The U.S. withdrew diplomatic recognition from the Nationalist government in Taipei and recognized the PRC government in Beijing. The U.S. continues to provide unofficial relations with Taiwan. (see also Taiwan–United States relations).

Colombia
Consulate: 1823
Recognized: 1822
Relations established: 1822
Legation/embassy established: 1823
First ambassador: Richard Clough Anderson, Jr.
Relations ended: —

Comoros
Consulate:
Recognized: 1977
Relations established: 1977
Legation/embassy established: 1985
First ambassador: Fernando Enrique Rondon
Relations ended: —
Notes:
The U.S. Ambassador to Madagascar is also accredited to the Comoros while resident in Antananarivo.
The American Embassy at Moroni was closed in 1993. Subsequent U.S. ambassadors to the Comoros also have been accredited to Mauritius, and resident at Port Louis.

Congo Free State
Consulate:
Recognized: 1885
Relations established: —
Legation/embassy established: —
First ambassador: —
Relations ended: 1908
Notes:
 The U.S. recognized the Congo Free State as the Independent State of Congo. The U.S. and the Congo Free State never established diplomatic relations. The Congo Free State was annexed as a colony by Belgium in 1908, which ended its existence as an independent sovereign state.

Congo, Democratic Republic of (Kinshasa)
Consulate:
Recognized: 1960
Relations established: 1960
Legation/embassy established: 1960
First ambassador: Clare H. Timberlake
Relations ended: —

Congo, Republic of (Brazzaville)
Consulate:
Recognized: 1960
Relations established: 1960
Legation/embassy established: 1960
First ambassador: W. Wendell Blancke
Relations ended: —
Notes:
Ambassador Blancke was commissioned to the Central African Republic, Chad, the Republic of the Congo, and Gabon, while resident in Brazzaville.
Diplomatic relations between the Republic of the Congo and the U.S. were suspended in 1965 and restored in 1977.

Costa Rica
Consulate:
Recognized: 1849
Relations established: 1855
Legation/embassy established: 1898
First ambassador: Solon Borland/Mirabeau B. Lamar
Relations ended: —
Notes:
Ambassador Borland was commissioned to Costa Rica but never presented credentials there.
Ambassador Lamar was the first official ambassador, having presented his credentials in 1858. Lamar was accredited to Nicaragua and Costa Rica while resident in Managua.
Diplomatic relations were interrupted in 1917, following a military coup d’état. Relations were resumed in 1920.

Ivory Coast
Consulate:
Recognized: 1960
Relations established: 1960
Legation/embassy established: 1960
First ambassador: R. Borden Reams
Relations ended: —
Notes:
Ambassador Reams was commissioned to Dahomey, Ivory Coast, Niger, and Upper Volta while resident in Abidjan.

Croatia
Consulate:
Recognized: 1992
Relations established: 1992
Legation/embassy established: 1992
First ambassador: Peter W. Galbraith (1993)
Relations ended: —

Cuba
Consulate:
Recognized: 1902
Relations established: 1902
Legation/embassy established: 1902
First ambassador: Herbert G. Squiers
Relations ended: 1961
Relations re-established: 2015
Notes:
The United States severed diplomatic relations with Cuba on January 3, 1961.
The United States opened again the diplomatic relations with Cuba on August 14, 2015.

Cyprus
Consulate:
Recognized: 1960
Relations established: 1960
Legation/embassy established: 1960
First ambassador: Fraser Wilkins
Relations ended: —

Czechoslovakia
Consulate: 1869
Recognized: 1918
Relations established: 1918
Legation/embassy established: 1919
First ambassador: Richard Crane
Relations ended: 1992
Notes:
1941–45: During WWII, the U.S. maintained diplomatic relations with the government-in-exile of Czechoslovakia in London.
Relations with Czechoslovakia ended in 1992 with the dissolution of the nation into the Czech Republic and Slovakia.

Czech Republic
Consulate:
Recognized: 1993
Relations established: 1993
Legation/embassy established: 1993
First ambassador: Adrian A. Basora
Relations ended: —
Notes:
Ambassador Basora had been the U.S. ambassador to Czechoslovakia and continued as ambassador to the Czech Republic.

Denmark
Consulate: 1792
Recognized: 1792
Relations established: 1801
Legation/embassy established: 1827
First ambassador: Henry Wheaton
Relations ended: —
Notes:

Djibouti
Consulate:
Recognized: 1977
Relations established: 1977
Legation/embassy established: 1977
First ambassador: Jerrold M. North (1980)
Relations ended: —

Dominica
Consulate:
Recognized: 1978
Relations established: 1979
Legation/embassy established: —
First ambassador: Sally Angela Shelton (Sally Shelton-Colby)
Relations ended: —
Notes:
The U.S. does not maintain an embassy in Dominica. The U.S. Ambassador in Barbados in Bridgetown is also accredited to Dominica.

Dominican Republic
Consulate:
Recognized: 1866
Relations established: 1884
Legation/embassy established: 1904
First ambassador: Thomas Cleland Dawson
Relations ended: —
Notes:
A series of chargés d’affaires represented the U.S. at the embassy in Santo Domingo until the first minister resident/consul general was appointed in 1904.
Until 1904 the U.S. Minister to Haiti was also accredited as the Chargé d’Affaires to the Dominican Republic.

East Timor – see Timor-Leste

Ecuador
Consulate: 1825
Recognized: 1832
Relations established: 1848
Legation/embassy established: 1848
First ambassador: Philo White (1853)
Relations ended: —
Notes:
A series of chargés d’affaires represented the U.S. at the embassy in Quito until the first minister resident was appointed in 1853.

Egypt
Consulate:
Recognized: 1922
Relations established: 1922
Legation/embassy established: 1922
First ambassador: J. Morton Howell
Relations ended: —
Notes:
Starting in 1849, while Egypt was part of the Ottoman Empire, the US maintained a "consular and quasi-diplomatic presence" there. The first "Agent and Consul General" was Daniel Smith McCauley. 
Egypt became independent in 1922.
Egypt and Syria united to form a new state, the United Arab Republic (UAR), in 1958. The U.S. recognized the UAR immediately. The U.S. embassy in Damascus was reclassified as a consulate general. Syria seceded from the union in 1961; however, Egypt continued to be known officially as the United Arab Republic until 1971.
Egypt severed diplomatic relations with the U.S. during the Six-Day War. Normal relations were restored in 1974. During the interruption of relations, the U.S. was represented by a U.S. Interests Section in the Embassy of Spain.

El Salvador
Consulate:
Recognized: 1849
Relations established: 1863
Legation/embassy established: 1863
First ambassador: James R. Partridge
Relations ended: —
Notes:
Diplomatic relations were handled through the Greater Republic of Central America 1896–98.
Relations were interrupted on December 4, 1931, when the U.S. did not recognize the new revolutionary government of El Salvador. Normal relations were resumed in 1934.

Equatorial Guinea
Consulate:
Recognized: 1968
Relations established: 1968
Legation/embassy established: 1969
First ambassador: Albert W. Sherer, Jr.
Relations ended: —
Notes:
The U.S. suspended diplomatic relations with Equatorial Guinea in 1976 after the U.S. ambassador and consul had been declared personae non gratae. Normal relations were resumed in 1979.
The U.S. embassy in Malabo was closed in 1995, and its functions transferred to the embassy in Yaoundé, Cameroon. The ambassador to Cameroon was also accredited to Equatorial Guinea while resident in Yaoundé. The embassy in Malabo was reopened in 2004 with the ambassador solely accredited to Equatorial Guinea.

Eritrea
Consulate:
Recognized: 1993
Relations established: 1993
Legation/embassy established: 1993
First ambassador: Robert Gordon Houdek
Relations ended: —

Estonia (1)
Consulate:
Recognized: 1922
Relations established: 1922
Legation/embassy established: 1922
First ambassador: Robert P. Skinner
Relations ended: 1940
Notes:
The first ambassadors were accredited to Estonia, Latvia, and Lithuania, while resident in Riga, Latvia.
The legation in Tallinn was closed in 1940, following the Soviet occupation of the Baltic states. The U.S. never recognized the government of Estonia under Soviet occupation.

Estonia (2)
Consulate:
Recognized: 1991
Relations established: 1991
Legation/embassy established: 1991
First ambassador: Robert C. Frasure
Relations ended: —
Notes:
The U.S. recognized the government of Estonia in 1991 after the collapse of the Soviet Union, reestablished diplomatic relations, and reopened the old legation in Tallinn as an embassy.

Ethiopia
Consulate:
Recognized: 1903
Relations established: 1903
Legation/embassy established: 1909
First ambassador: Hoffman Philip
Relations ended: —
Notes:
The U.S. Legation in Addis Ababa was closed and diplomatic personnel were withdrawn following the Italian occupation of Ethiopia in 1937. The U.S. never recognized Italian authority in Ethiopia. The legation was reopened and a new Minister Resident/Consul was appointed in 1943.
In July 1980, the U.S. ambassador to Ethiopia was recalled at the request of the Ethiopian government, and the U.S. Embassy in Ethiopia and the Ethiopian Embassy in the United States were headed by chargés d’affaires until 1993.

Fiji
Consulate: 1844
Recognized: 1970
Relations established: 1971
Legation/embassy established: 1971
First ambassador: Kenneth Franzheim II
Relations ended: —
Notes:
The first ambassadors were accredited to New Zealand, Fiji, and Tonga, while resident at Wellington, New Zealand.
The first ambassador resident in Suva, Fiji, was appointed in 1978. He was also accredited to Tonga and Tuvalu.

Finland
Consulate:
Recognized: 1919
Relations established: 1919
Legation/embassy established: 1920
First ambassador: Charles L. Kagey (1921)
Relations ended: —
Notes:
The U.S. severed diplomatic relations with Finland on 1944, as result of Finland's alliance with Germany against the Soviet Union. Relations were re-established in 1945.

France
Consulate: 1778
Recognized: 1778
Relations established: 1778
Legation/embassy established: 1779
First ambassador: Benjamin Franklin
Relations ended: —
Notes:
Diplomatic relations with France were severed in 1798 as a result of the XYZ Affair. Relations were restored in 1801.
U.S.–France diplomatic relations were severed in 1942 at the direction of the French Vichy government. The U.S. recognized the Provisional Government of the French Republic in Algiers in 1944. Normal diplomatic relations with France were restored, and the U.S. embassy in Paris was reopened in December 1944.

Gabon
Consulate:
Recognized: 1960
Relations established: 1960
Legation/embassy established: 1961
First ambassador: W. Wendell Blancke
Relations ended: —
Notes:
Ambassador Blancke was commissioned to the Central African Republic, Chad, the Republic of the Congo, and Gabon, while resident in Brazzaville.

Gambia, The
Consulate:
Recognized: 1965
Relations established: 1965
Legation/embassy established: 1965
First ambassador: Mercer Cook
Relations ended: —

Genoa, Republic of
Consulate: 1791
Recognized: 1791
Relations established: —
Legation/embassy established: —
First ambassador: —
Relations ended: 1805
Notes:
The Republic of Genoa recognized the U.S. in 1791. There is no clear record of reciprocation by the U.S., but President Washington accredited the Republic's Consul General in 1791. The U.S. and the Republic never established diplomatic relations. Genoa was annexed by France in 1805 and ceased to exist.

Georgia
Consulate:
Recognized: 1991
Relations established: 1992
Legation/embassy established: 1992
First ambassador: Kent N. Brown
Relations ended: —

German Confederation
Consulate:
Recognized: 1848
Relations established: 1848
Legation/embassy established: 1848
First ambassador: Andrew J. Donelson
Relations ended: 1867
Notes:
The short-lived German Confederation was absorbed into the North German Confederation in 1867. 
German Confederation, North
Consulate:
Recognized: 1867
Relations established: 1868
Legation/embassy established: —
First ambassador: George Bancroft
Relations ended: 1871
Notes:
Ambassador Bancroft was also the ambassador to Prussia.
The North German Union was abolished by the creation of the German Empire in 1871.

Germany (Prussia)
Consulate:
Recognized: 1797
Relations established: 1797
Legation/embassy established: 1797
First ambassador: John Quincy Adams
Relations ended: 1871
Notes:
Prussia became part of the German Empire in 1871.

Germany (German Empire)
Consulate: 1871
Recognized: 1871
Relations established: 1871
Legation/embassy established: 1871
First ambassador: George Bancroft
Relations ended: 1917
Notes:
The U.S. severed diplomatic relations with the German Empire in 1917. The U.S. declared war on Germany shortly thereafter.

Germany (1918–1941)
Consulate:
Recognized: 1921
Relations established: 1921
Legation/embassy established: 1921
First ambassador: Alanson B. Houghton
Relations ended: 1941
Notes:
Diplomatic relations with the Germany were broken off when Germany declared war on the U.S. in December 1941.
Mutual recognition between the U.S. and Germany was established by the Treaty of Berlin in 1921.

Germany, East (German Democratic Republic)
Consulate:
Recognized: 1974
Relations established: 1974
Legation/embassy established: 1974
First ambassador: John Sherman Cooper
Relations ended: 1990
Notes:
The German Democratic Republic ceased to exist on October 3, 1990, when it was absorbed into the Federal Republic of Germany (West Germany).

Germany
Consulate:
Recognized: 1949
Relations established: 1955
Legation/embassy established: 1955
First ambassador: James Bryant Conant
Relations ended: —
Notes:
The U.S. embassy in Bonn moved to Berlin in 1999.

Ghana
Consulate:
Recognized: 1957
Relations established: 1957
Legation/embassy established: 1957
First ambassador: Peter Rutter
Relations ended: —
Notes:
Ghana was known as Gold Coast until independence in 1957.

Greece
Consulate: 1837
Recognized: 1837
Relations established: 1868
Legation/embassy established: 1868
First ambassador: Charles K. Tuckerman
Relations ended: —
Notes:
The U.S. Embassy in Athens was closed in 1941 after the German occupation of Greece, and reopened in 1944. During wartime the U.S. maintained diplomatic relations with the government-in-exile of Greece in London (1941–43) and then in Cairo (1943–44).

Grenada
Consulate:
Recognized: 1975
Relations established: 1974
Legation/embassy established: 1984
First ambassador: Theodore R. Britton, Jr.
Relations ended: —
Notes:
The ambassador to Grenada is accredited to Grenada and Barbados, while resident at Bridgetown, Barbados.

Guatemala
Consulate:
Recognized: 1844
Relations established: 1849
Legation/embassy established: 1849
First ambassador: Solon Borland (1855)
Relations ended: —
Notes:
The U.S. had previously recognized Guatemala in 1824 as a part of the Federal Republic of Central America.
 A series of chargés d’affaires represented the U.S. until 1855.
Relations with Guatemala were interrupted briefly in June 1954, following a coup d’état. In July the U.S. recognized the new government and re-established diplomatic relations.

Guinea
Consulate:
Recognized: 1958
Relations established: 1959
Legation/embassy established: 1959
First ambassador: John H. Morrow
Relations ended: —

Guinea-Bissau
Consulate:
Recognized: 1974
Relations established: 1975
Legation/embassy established: 1976
First ambassador: Melissa F. Wells
Relations ended: —

Guyana
Consulate:
Recognized: 1966
Relations established: 1966
Legation/embassy established: 1966
First ambassador: Delmar R. Carlson
Relations ended: —

Haiti
Consulate:
Recognized: 1862
Relations established: 1862
Legation/embassy established: 1862
First ambassador: Benjamin F. Whidden
Relations ended: —
Notes:
Whidden's title was Commissioner and Consul General. The first Minister was Henry E. Peck in 1866.
Until 1904 the minister to Haiti was also accredited as the chargé d’affaires to the Dominican Republic.

Hanover, Kingdom of
Consulate:
Recognized: 1830
Relations established: —
Legation/embassy established: —
First ambassador: —
Relations ended: 1866
Notes:
The U.S. never established diplomatic relations with the Kingdom of Hanover. The Kingdom was conquered by Prussia in 1866 and ceased to exist.

Hanseatic Republics (Bremen, Lübeck, Hamburg)
Consulate: 1794
Recognized: 1790–94
Relations established: 1853
Legation/embassy established: —
First ambassador: —
Relations ended: 1868
Notes:
No U.S. minister or envoy was appointed; only consuls were appointed. Relations with the Hanseatic Republics ended in 1868 when the republics joined the North German Confederation.

Hawaii
Consulate: 1820
Recognized: 1826
Relations established: 1853
Legation/embassy established: 1853
First ambassador: David L. Gregg
Relations ended: 1898
Notes:
Gregg's title was Commissioner to the Kingdom of Hawaii. Gregg's predecessors were titled Commissioner to the Sandwich Islands. The office was not titled Legation until 1853.
In 1863 the rank of the Commissioner was raised to Minister Resident with the appointment of James McBride.
The Kingdom was overthrown in 1893 and a republic declared in 1894.
Diplomatic relations with Hawaii ended in 1898 when Hawaii was annexed to the United States.

Hesse
Consulate: 1829
Recognized: 1829
Relations established: 1829
Legation/embassy established: —
First ambassador: —
Relations ended: 1917
Notes:
George Bancroft, who was the minister to Prussia, was given special accreditation to Hesse.
Hesse joined the German Empire in 1871. Diplomatic relations with the German Empire were broken upon entry of the U.S. into WWI in 1917.

Holy See (see also Papal States)
Consulate: 1797
Recognized: 1984
Relations established: 1984
Legation/embassy established: 1984
First ambassador: William A. Wilson
Relations ended: —
Notes:
The U.S. maintained consular relations with the Papal States 1797–1870.
The U.S. has been represented at the Holy See since the early 20th century. Previous representatives had been titled Personal Representative of the President.

Honduras
Consulate:
Recognized: 1853
Relations established: 1853
Legation/embassy established: 1856
First ambassador: Solon Borland
Relations ended: —
Notes:
Honduras had been recognized in 1824 as part of the Federal Republic of Central America. It was recognized independently in 1853.
Ambassador Borland was accredited to Honduras, Costa Rica, Nicaragua, and El Salvador, but he did not present his credentials in Tegucigalpa.

Hungary
Consulate: 1869
Recognized: 1921
Relations established: 1921
Legation/embassy established: 1921
First ambassador: Theodore Brentano (1922)
Relations ended: —
Notes:
Hungary severed diplomatic relations on December 11, 1941, and declared war on the U.S. on December 13. Relations were restored in January 1945.
Diplomatic relations were interrupted in 1956, following the Soviet suppression of the Hungarian Revolution of 1956. From 1957 until 1967, no ambassador was commissioned to Hungary, but a series of chargés d’affaires represented the U.S.

Iceland
Consulate:
Recognized: 1944
Relations established: 1941
Legation/embassy established: 1941
First ambassador: Lincoln MacVeagh
Relations ended: —
Notes:
Iceland had been occupied by the U.S. since 1941, at the request of the Icelandic government, in order to forestall a feared German occupation.

India
Consulate: 1792
Recognized: 1947
Relations established: 1946
Legation/embassy established: 1946
First ambassador: Henry F. Grady
Relations ended: —
Notes:
The U.S. established diplomatic relations and an embassy in 1946, in anticipation of Indian independence in 1947.

Indonesia
Consulate: 1801
Recognized: 1949
Relations established: 1949
Legation/embassy established: 1949
First ambassador: Horace M. Cochran
Relations ended: —

Iran
Consulate:
Recognized: 1850
Relations established: 1883
Legation/embassy established: 1883
First ambassador: Frederick H. Winston (1885)
Relations ended: 1980
Notes:
Bayless W. Hanna had been appointed as the first Minister Resident to Persia and took the oath of office, but did not proceed to Persia.
The U.S. severed diplomatic relations with Iran on April 7, 1980 following the Iran hostage crisis.

Iraq
Consulate: 1888
Recognized: 1930
Relations established: 1931
Legation/embassy established: 1931
First ambassador: Paul Knabenshue
Relations ended: —
Notes:
Iraq severed diplomatic relations with the U.S. in June 1967 during the 1967 Arab-Israeli Six-Day War. Relations were reestablished in 1984. A U.S. Interests Section was established in the Belgian Embassy in Baghdad in 1972 in the interim.
The U.S. and Iraq mutually severed relations in 1991 following the Invasion of Kuwait. Diplomatic relations between the U.S. and Iraq were reestablished and the U.S. Embassy was reopened in 2004.

Ireland
Consulate:
Recognized: 1924
Relations established: 1924
Legation/embassy established: 1927
First ambassador: Frederick A. Sterling
Relations ended: —

Israel
Consulate:
Recognized: 1948
Relations established: 1949
Legation/embassy established: 1949
First ambassador: James Grover McDonald
Relations ended: —

Italy
Consulate: 1794
Recognized: 1861
Relations established: 1861
Legation/embassy established: 1861
First ambassador: George Perkins Marsh
Relations ended: —
Notes:
The U.S. maintained consulates in numerous Italian cities beginning in 1794.
The U.S. Legation was initially at Turin, then at Florence, and finally moved to Rome in 1871.
Diplomatic relations were severed and the American Embassy in Rome was closed on December 11, 1941, after Italy declared war on the United States. Relations were reestablished in 1944 and the embassy was reopened in 1945.

Jamaica
Consulate:
Recognized: 1962
Relations established: 1962
Legation/embassy established: 1962
First ambassador: William C. Doherty
Relations ended: —
Notes:
Ambassador Vincent de Roulet was declared persona non grata in 1973 and he was expelled.

Japan
Consulate: 1855
Recognized: 1854
Relations established: 1858
Legation/embassy established: 1859
First ambassador: Townsend Harris
Relations ended: —
Notes:
Diplomatic relations between Japan and the United States were mutually severed on December 8, 1941, when both nations declared war on each other in the wake of Japan's attack on Pearl Harbor. Normal diplomatic relations were resumed and the U.S. Embassy was reopened in Tokyo in 1952.

Jordan
Consulate:
Recognized: 1949
Relations established: 1949
Legation/embassy established: 1949
First ambassador: Gerald A. Drew (1950)
Relations ended: —

Kazakhstan
Consulate:
Recognized: 1991
Relations established: 1992
Legation/embassy established: 1992
First ambassador: William Harrison Courtney
Relations ended: —

Kenya
Consulate:
Recognized: 1963
Relations established: 1964
Legation/embassy established: 1964
First ambassador: William Attwood
Relations ended: —

Kiribati
Consulate:
Recognized: 1979
Relations established: 1980
Legation/embassy established: —
First ambassador: William Bodde, Jr.
Relations ended: —
Notes:
The first ambassadors were accredited to Fiji, Tonga, Tuvalu, and Kiribati, while resident at Suva, Fiji. There is no U.S. embassy in Kiribati.

Korea
Consulate:
Recognized: 1882
Relations established: 1882
Legation/embassy established: 1883
First ambassador: Lucius H. Foote
Relations ended: 1910
Notes:
Relations between Korea and the U.S. were established by the Chemulpo Treaty of 1882. Japan annexed Korea in 1910 and relations between the U.S. and Korea were interrupted.

Korea, North (Democratic People's Republic of Korea)
Consulate:
Recognized: —
Relations established: —
Legation/embassy established: —
First ambassador: —
Relations ended: —
Notes:
At the end of WWII, Korea was split into North and South along the 38th parallel. The Republic of Korea (South Korea) was established in 1948. The U.S. recognized South Korea in 1949 and established diplomatic relations, but never recognized the government of North Korea.

Korea, South (Republic of Korea)
Consulate:
Recognized: 1949
Relations established: 1949
Legation/embassy established: 1949
First ambassador: John J. Muccio
Relations ended: —
At the end of WWII, Korea was split into North and South along the 38th parallel. The Republic of Korea (South Korea) was established in 1948. The U.S. recognized South Korea in 1949 and established diplomatic relations, but never recognized the government of North Korea.

Kosovo
Consulate:
Recognized: 2008
Relations established: 2008
Legation/embassy established: 2008
First ambassador: Tina S. Kaidanow
Relations ended: —

Kuwait
Consulate: 1951
Recognized: 1961
Relations established: 1961
Legation/embassy established: 1961
First ambassador: Parker T. Hart
Relations ended: —
Notes:
The U.S. Embassy in Kuwait was closed and diplomatic staff were withdrawn in December 1990 due to the Iraqi invasion of Kuwait. The embassy was reopened in March 1991.

Kyrgyzstan
Consulate:
Recognized: 1991
Relations established: 1991
Legation/embassy established: 1992
First ambassador: Edward Hurwitz
Relations ended: —

Laos
Consulate: 1950
Recognized: 1950
Relations established: 1950
Legation/embassy established: 1950
First ambassador: Donald R. Heath
Relations ended: —
Notes:
Ambassador Heath was concurrently commissioned to Vietnam and Laos, while resident at Saigon. The first resident ambassador was Charles Woodruff Yost in 1954.
In 1975, after the establishment of the Communist Lao People's Democratic Republic, the U.S. recalled the ambassador. A series of chargés d’affaires represented the U.S. in Vientiane until 1992 when Charles B. Salmon was appointed ambassador.

Latvia (1)
Consulate:
Recognized: 1922
Relations established: 1922
Legation/embassy established: 1922
First ambassador: Frederick W. B. Coleman
Relations ended: 1940
Notes:
The first ambassadors were accredited to Latvia, Estonia, and Lithuania, while resident in Riga, Latvia.
The U.S. Legation in Riga was closed in 1940 following the Soviet invasion and annexation of the Baltic states. The U.S. government allowed Latvian diplomats to remain in the U.S. and maintained the position that they were the legal representatives of the Latvian government. The U.S. never recognized the Latvian government under the Soviet Union.

Latvia (2)
Consulate:
Recognized: 1991
Relations established: 1991
Legation/embassy established: 1991
First ambassador: Ints M. Silins
Relations ended: —
Notes:
In 1991, after the collapse of the Soviet Union, the U.S. recognized Latvia's independence, restored diplomatic relations, and reopened the embassy.

Lebanon
Consulate: 1942
Recognized: 1944
Relations established: 1944
Legation/embassy established: 1944
First ambassador: George Wadsworth
Relations ended: —
Notes:
Ambassador Wadsworth had been serving in Lebanon as Diplomatic Agent/Consul General since 1942. He was promoted to Envoy Extraordinary and Minister Plenipotentiary upon establishment of U.S.–Syria diplomatic relations. He was concurrently commissioned to Lebanon and Syria, while resident in Beirut.
The U.S. withdrew all diplomatic personnel and closed the embassy in 1989 due to safety concerns during the Lebanon civil war. The embassy was reopened in 1990 with Ryan Crocker as ambassador.

Lesotho
Consulate:
Recognized: 1966
Relations established: 1966
Legation/embassy established: 1966
First ambassador: Charles J. Nelson (1971)
Relations ended: —
Notes:
Until 1979 one ambassador was accredited to Lesotho, Swaziland, and Botswana while resident in Gaborone, Botswana.

Lew Chew (Ryūkyū Kingdom)
Consulate:
Recognized: 1854
Relations established: —
Legation/embassy established: —
First ambassador: —
Relations ended: 1879
Notes:
The U.S. never established diplomatic relations with the kingdom. Lew Chew was annexed by Japan in 1879 and ceased to exist as a sovereign state.

Liberia
Consulate:
Recognized: 1862
Relations established: 1864
Legation/embassy established: 1864
First ambassador: Abraham Hanson (Commissioner and Consul General)
Relations ended: —
Notes:
The first representative, Hanson, was titled Commissioner and Consul General. The next envoy was given the title Minister Resident/Consul General.

Libya
Consulate:
Recognized: 1951
Relations established: 1951
Legation/embassy established: 1951
First ambassador: Henry Serrano Villard (1952)
Relations ended: —
Notes:
No U.S. ambassador had been appointed to Libya since Joseph Palmer left his post in 1972. A series of chargés d’affaires represented the U.S. until 1980. The U.S. and Libya closed their embassies in 1980 and 1981, respectively, but diplomatic relations were not formally severed. In 2006 the U.S. and Libya formally resumed diplomatic relations. Gene Cretz was appointed ambassador in 2008.

Liechtenstein
Consulate:
Recognized: 1926
Relations established: 1997
Legation/embassy established: —
First ambassador: Madeleine M. Kunin
Relations ended: —
Notes:
Liechtenstein was represented in foreign affairs by Switzerland until 1997. The U.S. ambassador to Switzerland is also accredited to Liechtenstein, while resident in Bern.

Lithuania (1)
Consulate:
Recognized: 1922
Relations established: 1922
Legation/embassy established: 1922
First ambassador: Frederick W.B. Coleman
Relations ended: 1940
Notes:
The first ambassadors to Lithuania were accredited to Latvia, Lithuania, and Estonia, while resident in Riga, Latvia.
The U.S. Legation was closed in August 1940 following the Soviet invasion and annexation of the Baltic states. The U.S. government allowed Lithuanian diplomats to remain in the U.S. and maintained the position that they were the legal representatives of the Lithuanian government. The U.S. never recognized the Lithuanian government under the Soviet Union.

Lithuania (2)
Consulate:
Recognized: 1991
Relations established: 1991
Legation/embassy established: 1991
First ambassador: Darryl N. Johnson
Relations ended: —
Notes:
Following the collapse of the Soviet Union in 1991, The U.S. recognized the Lithuanian government, resumed diplomatic relations, and reopened the embassy in Vilnius.

Luxembourg
Consulate:
Recognized: 1878
Relations established: 1903
Legation/embassy established: 1903
First ambassador: Stanford Newel
Relations ended: —
Notes:
The first ambassador was accredited to the Netherlands and Luxembourg, while resident at The Hague, Netherlands.
In 1940 the U.S. Legation in Luxembourg was closed following the German occupation of Luxembourg. The U.S. maintained relations with the government-in-exile of Luxembourg in Ottawa, Ontario, Canada (1941–43) and then in London (1943–44). The U.S. Legation in Luxembourg was reestablished in September 1944.

Macedonia
Consulate:
Recognized: 1994
Relations established: 1995
Legation/embassy established: 1993
First ambassador: Christopher R. Hill
Relations ended: —

Madagascar
Consulate: 1874
Recognized: 1960
Relations established: 1960
Legation/embassy established: 1960
First ambassador: Frederic Pearson Bartlett
Relations ended: —
Notes:
U.S. Ambassador Anthony D. Marshall was expelled in 1971. Another ambassador was appointed the following year.

Malawi
Consulate:
Recognized: 1964
Relations established: 1964
Legation/embassy established: 1964
First ambassador: Samuel Patrick Gilstrap
Relations ended: —

Malaysia
Consulate: 1918
Recognized: 1957
Relations established: 1957
Legation/embassy established: 1957
First ambassador: Homer Morrison Byington
Relations ended: —
Notes:
Malaysia was recognized as Federation of Malaya in 1957. In 1963 Malaya joined with Singapore, Sarawak, and Sabah to form the Federation of Malaysia. Henceforth all U.S. ambassadors were accredited to the Federation of Malaysia.

Maldives
Consulate:
Recognized: 1965
Relations established: 1966
Legation/embassy established: —
First ambassador: Cecil Burton Lyon
Relations ended: —
Notes:
One ambassador is accredited to the Maldives and Sri Lanka, while resident in Colombo, Sri Lanka. In 1967 the then-current ambassador to Sri Lanka, Cecil B. Lyon, was given an additional commission to the Maldives. There is no U.S. embassy in Malé, Maldives.

Mali
Consulate:
Recognized: 1960
Relations established: 1960
Legation/embassy established: 1960
First ambassador: Thomas K. Wright
Relations ended: —
Notes:
Henry Serrano Villard was commissioned to the Federation of Mali in 1960 but the Federation split apart before Villard could proceed to the post. Villard became the ambassador to Senegal.

Malta
Consulate:
Recognized: 1964
Relations established: 1964
Legation/embassy established: 1964
First ambassador: George J. Feldman (1965)
Relations ended: —

Marshall Islands
Consulate:
Recognized: 1979
Relations established: 1987
Legation/embassy established: 1987
First ambassador: William Bodde (1990)
Relations ended: —

Mauritania
Consulate:
Recognized: 1960
Relations established: 1960
Legation/embassy established: 1962
First ambassador: Henry Serrano Villard
Relations ended: —
Notes:
Mauritania severed diplomatic relations with the United States on June 7, 1967, in the wake of the 1967 Arab-Israeli War, and the U.S. embassy was closed. Relations were resumed in 1969 and Embassy Nouakchott was reopened in 1970.

Mauritius
Consulate:
Recognized: 1968
Relations established: 1968
Legation/embassy established: 1968
First ambassador: David S. King
Relations ended: —
Notes:
The first ambassador was concurrently commissioned to Madagascar and Mauritius while resident at Antananarivo, Madagascar.Mecklenburg-Schwerin, Grand Duchy ofConsulate: 1816
Recognized: 1816
Relations established: —
Legation/embassy established: —
First ambassador: —
Relations ended: 1867
Notes:
The United States and the Grand Duchy of Mecklenburg-Schwerin never established diplomatic relations. The Grand Duchy joined the North German Confederation in 1867, thus ending independent foreign relations.Mecklenburg-Strelitz, Grand Duchy ofConsulate:
Recognized: 1853
Relations established: —
Legation/embassy established: —
First ambassador: —
Relations ended: 1867
Notes:
The United States and the Grand Duchy of Mecklenburg-Strelitz never established diplomatic relations. The Grand Duchy joined the North German Confederation in 1867 and ceased to exist as a sovereign state.MexicoConsulate:
Recognized: 1822
Relations established: 1825
Legation/embassy established: 1825
First ambassador: Joel Roberts Poinsett
Relations ended: —
Notes:
Mexico severed diplomatic relations with the U.S. in 1845 upon the annexation of Texas by the U.S. Relations were reestablished in 1848 following the Treaty of Guadalupe Hidalgo ending the Mexican–American War.
Mexico severed diplomatic relations with the U.S. in 1914 following the Tampico Affair. Diplomatic relations were reestablished  in 1917.MicronesiaConsulate:
Recognized: 1986
Relations established: 1986
Legation/embassy established: 1989
First ambassador: Aurelia Erskine Brazeal (1990)
Relations ended: —MoldovaConsulate:
Recognized: 1991
Relations established: 1992
Legation/embassy established: 1992
First ambassador: Mary C. Pendleton
Relations ended: —MonacoConsulate: 1874
Recognized: 1865
Relations established: 2006
Legation/embassy established: —
First ambassador: Craig Roberts Stapleton
Relations ended: —
Notes:
The U.S. ambassador to France is concurrently accredited to Monaco.MongoliaConsulate:
Recognized: 1987
Relations established: 1987
Legation/embassy established: 1988
First ambassador: Richard Llewellyn Williams
Relations ended: —
Notes:
Diplomatic relations were established during the late Cold War era with the Mongolian People's Republic and have continued uninterrupted since the 1990 Democratic Revolution in Mongolia.MontenegroConsulate:
Recognized: 1994
Relations established: 1995
Legation/embassy established: 1995
First ambassador: Christopher R. Hill
Relations ended: —MoroccoConsulate: 1797
Recognized: 1786
Relations established: 1905
Legation/embassy established: 1905
First ambassador: Samuel Rene Gummere
Relations ended: —
Notes:
1912–1956: Morocco came under the control of France and Spain as protectorates. The United States did not initially recognize the French and Spanish protectorates over Morocco. However, in 1917 upon U.S. entry into the First World War, the U.S. government recognized the protectorates. The U.S. Minister at Tangier was downgraded to the status of Diplomatic Agent. In 1956 the U.S. recognized Morocco's independence, established an embassy in Rabat, and appointed a ranking ambassador, Cavendish W. Cannon.MozambiqueConsulate:
Recognized: 1975
Relations established: 1975
Legation/embassy established: 1975
First ambassador: Willard Ames De Pree (1976)
Relations ended: —Myanmar (see Burma)NamibiaConsulate:
Recognized: 1990
Relations established: 1990
Legation/embassy established: 1990
First ambassador: Willard Ames De Pree
Relations ended: —Nassau, Duchy ofConsulate: 1853
Recognized: 1846
Relations established: —
Legation/embassy established: —
First ambassador: —
Relations ended: 1866
Notes:
The U.S. and the Duchy of Nassau never established formal diplomatic relations. As a result of the Austro-Prussian War, the Duchy was absorbed into the Kingdom of Prussia in 1866 and ceased to exist as a sovereign state.NauruConsulate:
Recognized: 1974
Relations established: 1974
Legation/embassy established: —
First ambassador: Marshall Green
Relations ended: —
Notes:
The first ambassador to Nauru, Marshall Green, was concurrently accredited to Australia and Nauru, while resident at Canberra.NepalConsulate:
Recognized: 1947
Relations established: 1947
Legation/embassy established: 1959
First ambassador: Henry F. Grady
Relations ended: —
Notes:
1947–1959: The first US ambassadors to India were concurrently commissioned to India and Nepal, while resident in New Delhi. In 1959 an embassy was opened in Kathmandu with an ambassador solely commissioned to Nepal.NetherlandsConsulate: 1798
Recognized: 1781
Relations established: 1781
Legation/embassy established: 1781
First ambassador: John Adams
Relations ended: —
Notes:
Adams was concurrently commissioned to the U. K. and the Netherlands, while resident in London.
In 1801 The U.S. closed the legation in The Hague and withdrew the ambassador. The embassy was reopened and another ambassador was commissioned in 1814 when the Netherlands became independent of France.
The U.S. legation in The Hague was closed in 1940 following the German invasion of the Netherlands. During WWII the U.S. maintained diplomatic relations with the government-in-exile of the Netherlands in London. The embassy in The Hague was reopened in August 1945.New ZealandConsulate:
Recognized: 1942
Relations established: 1942
Legation/embassy established: 1942
First ambassador: Patrick J. Hurley
Relations ended: —NicaraguaConsulate:
Recognized: 1849
Relations established: 1849
Legation/embassy established: 1851
First ambassador: Solon Borland (1853)
Relations ended: —
Notes:
Nicaragua had previously been recognized as part of the Federal Republic of Central America.
Ambassador Borland was concurrently commissioned to Costa Rica, El Salvador, Guatemala, Honduras, and Nicaragua.
The U.S. severed diplomatic relations with Nicaragua on December 1, 1909. Normal diplomatic relations were restored in 1911.
The U.S. severed diplomatic relations with Nicaragua and withdrew recognition in 1926 following a coup d’état by Emiliano Chamorro Vargas. The U.S. recognized the successor government and reestablished relations later that year.
The U.S. severed diplomatic relations with Nicaragua in 1947 following a coup d’état by Anastasio Somoza García. Relations were reestablished in 1948 following elections in Nicaragua.
In 1988 the Sandinista government of Nicaragua expelled the U.S. ambassador and seven members of the diplomatic corps. The embassy remained open under a chargé d’affaires a.i. until a new ambassador was commissioned in 1990.NigerConsulate:
Recognized: 1960
Relations established: 1960
Legation/embassy established: 1961
First ambassador: R. Borden Reams
Relations ended: —
Notes:
Ambassador Reams was commissioned to Dahomey, Ivory Coast, Niger, and Upper Volta while resident in Abidjan.NigeriaConsulate:
Recognized: 1960
Relations established: 1960
Legation/embassy established: 1960
First ambassador: Joseph Palmer II
Relations ended: —NorwayConsulate: 1809
Recognized: 1905
Relations established: 1905
Legation/embassy established: 1905
First ambassador: Herbert H. D. Peirce (1906)
Relations ended: —
Notes:
Prior to 1905, Sweden and Norway were politically united. The United States Ambassador to Sweden thus was the U.S. representative for Norway as well as Sweden. In 1905 Sweden and Norway peacefully separated and Norway became an independent constitutional monarchy.
Strictly, Charles H. Graves was the first U.S. ambassador to Norway. He was the ambassador to Sweden in 1905 when Sweden and Norway separated, and he represented the U.S. to both Sweden and Norway until June 1906 when Ambassador Peirce presented his credentials.
The U.S. legation in Oslo was closed in August 1940 following the German invasion of Norway. Diplomatic relations with Norway were maintained with the government-in-exile of Norway in London during WWII. The embassy in Oslo was reopened in May 1945 under Ambassador Lithgow Osborne.Oldenburg, Duchy ofConsulate:
Recognized: 1829
Relations established: —
Legation/embassy established: —
First ambassador: —
Relations ended: 1867
Notes:
The U.S. and the Duchy of Oldenburg never established diplomatic relations. The Duchy was absorbed into the North German Confederation in 1867 and ceased to exist as a sovereign state.OmanConsulate: 1880
Recognized: 1833
Relations established: 1972
Legation/embassy established: 1972
First ambassador: William Stoltzfus
Relations ended: —
Notes:
Ambassador Stoltzfus was concurrently commissioned to Oman, Bahrain, Kuwait, Qatar, and the United Arab Emirates while resident in Kuwait. The first ambassador commissioned solely to Oman was William D. Wolle in 1974.Orange Free StateConsulate: 1891
Recognized: 1871
Relations established: —
Legation/embassy established: —
First ambassador: —
Relations ended: 1902
Notes:
The U.S. and the Orange Free State never established formal diplomatic relations. In 1902 the Orange Free State was absorbed into the British Empire and ceased to exist as a sovereign state.PakistanConsulate:
Recognized: 1947
Relations established: 1947
Legation/embassy established: 1947
First ambassador: Paul H. Alling
Relations ended: —PalauConsulate:
Recognized: 1994
Relations established: 1996
Legation/embassy established: 2004
First ambassador: Thomas C. Hubbard
Relations ended: —
Notes:
The first U.S. ambassador to the Philippines was concurrently accredited to Palau while resident in Manila. Since 2004 one ambassador has been solely accredited to Palau.PanamaConsulate: 1823
Recognized: 1903
Relations established: 1903
Legation/embassy established: 1903
First ambassador: William Insco Buchanan
Relations ended: —
Notes:
Panama was part of Colombia until 1903.
Diplomatic relations between the U.S. and Panama were briefly interrupted in January 1931 following a coup d’état. Relations were resumed after about two weeks.
Diplomatic relations between the U.S. and Panama were interrupted for about three weeks November–December 1949 following government upheaval in Panama.
The government of Panama severed diplomatic relations with the U.S. in January 1964, following the Flag Pole Incident in the Canal Zone. Normal relations were resumed in April 1964.
Diplomatic relations between the U.S. and Panama were briefly interrupted October–November 1968 following a coup d’état. Relations were resumed after about four weeks.
President George H. W. Bush recalled the U.S. Ambassador in May 1989, following dictator Noriega's refusal to cede power after an election. Relations with a new Panamanian government were restored following the U.S. invasion of Panama and the capture of Noriega in January 1990.Papal States (see also Holy See)
Consulate: 1797
Recognized:  
Relations established: 1848
Legation/embassy established: 1848
First ambassador: Lewis Cass, Jr.
Relations ended: 1870
Notes:
There is no clear record of a date for diplomatic recognition of the Papal States by the United States.
The American mission to the Papal States closed in 1867 after Congress refused to fund the mission any longer.
Rome was incorporated into the Kingdom of Italy in 1870 and the Papal States ceased to exist. For later representation, see Holy See.Papua New GuineaConsulate: 1974
Recognized: 1975
Relations established: 1975
Legation/embassy established: 1975
First ambassador: Mary S. Olmsted
Relations ended: —ParaguayConsulate:
Recognized: 1852
Relations established: 1861
Legation/embassy established: 1861
First ambassador: Charles Ames Washburn
Relations ended: —
Notes:
Washburn was appointed as Commissioner in 1861 and promoted to Minister Resident in 1863.
From 1870 until 1914, one minister was concurrently commissioned to Paraguay and Uruguay, while resident in Montevideo, Uruguay.Parma, Duchy ofConsulate:
Recognized: 1850
Relations established: 1853
Legation/embassy established: —
First ambassador: —
Relations ended: 1860
Notes:
No ambassadors were exchanged between the Duchy of Parma and the U.S. The Duchy was absorbed into the Kingdom of Piedmont-Sardinia in 1860 and ceased to exist as a sovereign state.PeruConsulate:
Recognized: 1826
Relations established: 1827
Legation/embassy established: 1827
First ambassador: John Randolph Clay (1853)
Relations ended: —
Notes:
A series of chargés represented the U.S. in Peru until 1853, when the first ranking minister was appointed.Peru–Bolivian ConfederationConsulate:
Recognized: 1837
Relations established: 1837
Legation/embassy established: 1837
First ambassador: James B. Thornton (chargé d’affaires)
Relations ended: 1839
Notes:
The Peru–Bolivian Confederation was dissolved in 1839.
Chargé d’Affaires Thornton was commissioned to Peru but received by the government of the Peru–Bolivian Confederation. Two chargés represented the U.S. during the period of the Confederation. No ranking minister was appointed.
The second chargé, James C. Pickett, was commissioned to the Confederation, but presented his credentials in 1840, after the dissolution of the Confederation; thus he was received by the government of Peru.PhilippinesConsulate:
Recognized: 1946
Relations established: 1946
Legation/embassy established: 1946
First ambassador: Paul V. McNutt
Relations ended: —Piedmont-SardiniaConsulate: 1802
Recognized: 1802
Relations established: 1839
Legation/embassy established: 1840
First ambassador: Hezekiah Gold Rogers
Relations ended: 1861
Notes:
No U.S. ambassador was appointed to Piedmont-Sardinia. The Chargé d’Affaires to Italy represented the U.S.
Piedmont-Sardinia was absorbed into the Kingdom of Italy in 1861 and ceased to exist as a sovereign state.PolandConsulate: 1871
Recognized: 1919
Relations established: 1919
Legation/embassy established: 1919
First ambassador: Hugh S. Gibson
Relations ended: —
Notes:
The U.S. embassy in Warsaw was closed in September 1939 following the German invasion of Poland. The U.S. continued diplomatic relations with the government-in-exile of Poland during WWII, first in France (September 1939–June 1940) and then in England (1940–1945). The embassy in Warsaw was reopened in August 1945.PortugalConsulate: 1790
Recognized: 1791
Relations established: 1791
Legation/embassy established: 1791
First ambassador: David Humphreys
Relations ended: —
Notes:
During the Napoleonic Wars, the King of Portugal fled to Brazil. The U.S. legation followed and was located in Rio de Janeiro 1810–21. The legation in Lisbon reopened in 1822.QatarConsulate:
Recognized: 1971
Relations established: 1972
Legation/embassy established: 1973
First ambassador: William Stoltzfus
Relations ended: —
Notes:
Ambassador Stoltzfus was concurrently commissioned to Oman, Bahrain, Kuwait, Qatar, and the United Arab Emirates while resident in Kuwait. The first ambassador commissioned solely to Qatar was Robert P. Paganelli in 1974.RomaniaConsulate: 1866
Recognized: 1881
Relations established: 1880
Legation/embassy established: 1880
First ambassador: Eugene Schuyler
Relations ended: —
Notes:
Minister Schuyler's original office was Consul General. He was promoted to Minister Resident in 1883. Schuyler was concurrently minister to Romania, Serbia, and Greece while resident in Athens.
Romania declared war on the U.S. in December 1941 and severed diplomatic relations. Ambassador Franklin Mott Gunther died before he could leave the country. Diplomatic relations were reestablished in 1946 and the legation was reopened in 1947.RussiaConsulate: 1780
Recognized: 1780
Relations established: 1809
Legation/embassy established: 1809
First ambassador: John Quincy Adams
Relations ended: —
Notes:
U.S.–Russia diplomatic relations were interrupted in 1917 following the November Bolshevik Revolution in Russia. Diplomatic relations were never formally severed, but the U.S. refused to recognize or have any formal relations with the Bolshevik/Soviet governments.
In 1918, the U.S. embassy, which had been in St. Petersburg, was moved to Vologda and then to Arkhangelsk because of the close proximity of German troops during WWI.
In 1919 the U.S. embassy in Arkhangelsk was closed and diplomatic personnel were withdrawn.
In 1933 normal diplomatic relations were resumed, when President Roosevelt informed the Soviet Foreign Minister that the U.S. recognized the government of the U.S. S. R. and wished to establish normal diplomatic relations. The American embassy, which had been closed since 1919, was opened in Moscow.
In 1991, following the dissolution of the Soviet Union, the U.S. recognized the Russian Federation as the successor to the Soviet Union and reestablished normal diplomatic relations.RwandaConsulate:
Recognized: 1962
Relations established: 1962
Legation/embassy established: 1962
First ambassador: Charles D. Withers
Relations ended: —Saint Kitts and NevisConsulate:
Recognized: 1983
Relations established: 1983
Legation/embassy established: —
First ambassador: Thomas H. Anderson, Jr.
Relations ended: —
Notes:
The United States Ambassador to Barbados and the Eastern Caribbean represents the U.S. to Saint Kitts and Nevis, while resident at Bridgetown, Barbados.Saint LuciaConsulate:
Recognized: 1979
Relations established: —
Legation/embassy established: —
First ambassador: Sally Angela Shelton (Sally Shelton-Colby)
Relations ended: —
Notes:
The United States Ambassador to Barbados and the Eastern Caribbean represents the U.S. to Saint Lucia, while resident at Bridgetown, Barbados.Saint Vincent and the GrenadinesConsulate:
Recognized: 1981
Relations established: 1981
Legation/embassy established: —
First ambassador: Milan D. Bish
Relations ended: —
Notes:
The United States Ambassador to Barbados and the Eastern Caribbean represents the U.S. to Saint Vincent and the Grenadines, while resident at Bridgetown, Barbados.SamoaConsulate: 1856
Recognized: 1962
Relations established: 1971
Legation/embassy established: 1988
First ambassador: Kenneth Franzheim II
Relations ended: —
Notes:
The U.S. Ambassador to New Zealand is concurrently accredited to Fiji, Samoa, and Tonga, while resident in Wellington, New Zealand.San MarinoConsulate: 1925
Recognized: 1861
Relations established: 1861
Legation/embassy established: —
First ambassador: Ronald P. Spogli
Relations ended: —
Notes:
The United States recognized San Marino when President Abraham Lincoln, in a letter dated May 7, 1861, accepted San Marino's offer of honorary citizenship.
The U.S. Ambassador to Italy is concurrently accredited to San Marino, while resident in Rome.São Tomé and PríncipeConsulate:
Recognized: 1975
Relations established: 1976
Legation/embassy established: —
First ambassador: Andrew L. Steigman
Relations ended: —
Notes:
The U.S. Ambassador to Gabon is concurrently commissioned to São Tomé and Príncipe, while resident in Libreville, Gabon. There is no U.S. embassy in São Tomé.Saudi ArabiaConsulate:
Recognized: 1931
Relations established: 1940
Legation/embassy established: 1942
First ambassador: Bert Fish
Relations ended: —
Notes:
Ambassador Fish was concurrently accredited to Egypt and Saudi Arabia, while resident at Cairo. The first ambassador solely accredited to Saudi Arabia was James S. Moose, Jr. in 1943.Schaumburg-LippeConsulate:
Recognized: 1854
Relations established: —
Legation/embassy established: —
First ambassador: —
Relations ended: 1867
Notes:
The U.S. and the Principality of Schaumburg-Lippe never established formal diplomatic relations. The principality joined the North German Confederation in 1867 and ceased to exist as a sovereign state.SenegalConsulate:
Recognized: 1960
Relations established: 1960
Legation/embassy established: 1960
First ambassador: Henry Serrano Villard
Relations ended: —
Notes:
Until 1980 the ambassadors to Senegal were concurrently accredited to other west African nations, while resident in Dakar, Senegal. In 1980 Walter Carrington was appointed as the first ambassador solely commissioned to Senegal.SerbiaConsulate:
Recognized: 1881
Relations established: 1882
Legation/embassy established: 1882
First ambassador: Eugene Schuyler
Relations ended: —
Notes:
Serbia was recognized as Kingdom of Serbia in 1881. The first ambassadors were accredited to Greece, Romania, and Serbia, while resident in Athens.
In the wake of the breakup of the Austrian Empire following WWI, the nation was first named the Kingdom of Serbs, Croats and Slovenes and was renamed the Kingdom of Yugoslavia in 1929.
The government of Yugoslavia went into exile in England on April 14, 1941, in anticipation of German occupation. The U.S. Legation was closed. The U.S. continued diplomatic relations with the government-in-exile in London (1941–43), then in Cairo (1943–44), and then back to London. The U.S. Embassy in Belgrade was reopened in March 1945.
In 1992 the U.S. announced that it would not recognize the Federal Republic of Yugoslavia (FRY) as a successor state of the Socialist Federal Republic of Yugoslavia (SFRY). The U.S. ambassador was recalled but the mission continued under the authority of a chargé d'affaires ad interim.
In 1999 the U.S. severed diplomatic relations with the FRY and closed the embassy in Belgrade. Diplomatic recognition and full diplomatic relations between the two countries were established in 2000.SeychellesConsulate:
Recognized: 1976
Relations established: 1976
Legation/embassy established: 1976
First ambassador: Anthony Dryden Marshall
Relations ended: —
Notes:
Until 1982 the ambassadors were concurrently accredited to Kenya and the Seychelles, while resident at Nairobi, Kenya. In 1982–96 one ambassador was accredited solely to the Seychelles. In 1996 the U.S. embassy in Victoria was closed and the U.S. ambassador to Mauritius served concurrently as ambassador to the Seychelles, while resident in Port Louis, Mauritius.Sierra LeoneConsulate:
Recognized: 1961
Relations established: 1961
Legation/embassy established: 1961
First ambassador: Albert Sidney Johnson Carnahan
Relations ended: —SingaporeConsulate: 1836
Recognized: 1965
Relations established: 1966
Legation/embassy established: 1966
First ambassador: Francis Joseph Galbraith
Relations ended: —SlovakiaConsulate:
Recognized: 1993
Relations established: 1993
Legation/embassy established: 1993
First ambassador: Theodore E. Russell
Relations ended: —SloveniaConsulate:
Recognized: 1992
Relations established: 1992
Legation/embassy established: 1992
First ambassador: E. Allan Wendt
Relations ended: —Solomon IslandsConsulate:
Recognized: 1978
Relations established: 1978
Legation/embassy established: 1978
First ambassador: Mary S. Olmsted
Relations ended: —
Notes:
The ambassador to the Solomon Islands is concurrently accredited to Papua New Guinea and the Solomon Islands, while resident in Port Moresby, Papua New Guinea.
The U.S. Embassy in at Honiara was closed on July 30, 1993 but diplomatic relations continued through the nonresident ambassador.SomaliaConsulate:
Recognized: 1960
Relations established: 1960
Legation/embassy established: 1960
First ambassador: Andrew G. Lynch
Relations ended: —
Notes:
The U.S. embassy was closed in 1991 and all U.S. personnel were withdrawn after the collapse of the central Somali government. However, the U.S. never severed diplomatic relations with Somalia. The U.S. maintains regular dialogue with the Transitional Federal Government and other key stakeholders in Somalia through the U.S. embassy in Nairobi, Kenya.South AfricaConsulate:
Recognized: 1929
Relations established: 1929
Legation/embassy established: 1929
First ambassador: Ralph James Totten
Relations ended: —South SudanConsulate: —
Recognized: July 9, 2011
Relations established: July 9, 2011
Embassy established: July 9, 2011
First ambassador: R. Barrie Walkley, Chargé d’Affaires
Relations ended: —
Notes:
A U.S. consulate had been established in Juba prior to independence of South Sudan. The previous consulate was elevated to embassy status upon U.S. recognition of South Sudan.SpainConsulate: 1797
Recognized: 1783
Relations established: 1783
Legation/embassy established: 1783
First ambassador: William Short (1794)
Relations ended: —
Notes:
The Continental Congress of the United States of America sent John Jay to Spain in 1779 in an attempt to convince the Spanish Court to recognize the new nation. Jay spent two years in Spain but the court declined to receive him. Thus he was not officially the ambassador to Spain.
Spain finally recognized the U.S. in 1783 when it became apparent that Britain and the U.S. would sign a treaty to end the war.
Spain severed diplomatic relations with the United States on April 21, 1898, and the legation in Madrid was closed on that day. The United States declared war on Spain as of that date by an Act of Congress approved April 25, 1898. Relations were restored in June 1899.Sri LankaConsulate:
Recognized: 1948
Relations established: 1948
Legation/embassy established: 1949
First ambassador: Felix Cole
Relations ended: —SudanConsulate:
Recognized: 1956
Relations established: 1956
Legation/embassy established: 1956
First ambassador: Lowell C. Pinkerton
Relations ended: —
Notes:
Sudan severed diplomatic relations with the United States on June 7, 1967, in the wake of the 1967 Arab-Israeli War. A U.S. Interests Section was established in the embassy of the Netherlands. Normal relations were restored and the embassy was reopened in 1972.
Ambassador Cleo A. Noel, Jr. was assassinated at post on March 2, 1973.
The U.S. Embassy in Khartoum was closed in February 1996. The embassy was reopened in 2002. No U.S. ambassador has been appointed since 2002 and a series of chargés d’affaires has represented the U.S. in Khartoum.SurinameConsulate:
Recognized: 1975
Relations established: 1975
Legation/embassy established: 1975
First ambassador: Joseph Owen Zurhellen
Relations ended: —SwazilandConsulate:
Recognized: 1968
Relations established: 1968
Legation/embassy established: 1968
First ambassador: Charles J. Nelson (1971)
Relations ended: —
Notes:
Until 1979 one ambassador was accredited to Botswana, Swaziland, and Lesotho, while resident at Gaborone, Botswana.SwedenConsulate: 1818
Recognized: 1783
Relations established: 1818
Legation/embassy established: 1818
First ambassador: Jonathan Russell (1814)
Relations ended: —
Notes:
Benjamin Franklin, who was the U.S. Minister to France, had been appointed additionally as Minister to Sweden. He did not proceed to Stockholm and was not officially received by the court; thus he was not officially the Minister to Sweden. Nevertheless, he negotiated a treaty of friendship and recognition with Sweden.
Minister Russell was appointed Minister to Sweden in 1814 but did not present his credentials until 1818 when diplomatic relations were officially established between Sweden and the U.S.
A series of chargés d’affaires represented the U.S. in Stockholm 1818–1849, when Francis Schroeder was appointed Minister Resident.SwitzerlandConsulate: 1829
Recognized: 1829
Relations established: 1853
Legation/embassy established: 1853
First ambassador: Theodore Sedgwick Fay
Relations ended: —SyriaConsulate:
Recognized: 1944
Relations established: 1944
Legation/embassy established: 1944
First ambassador: George Wadsworth
Relations ended: —
Notes:
Ambassador Wadsworth had been serving in Lebanon as Diplomatic Agent/Consul General since 1942. He was promoted to Envoy Extraordinary and Minister Plenipotentiary upon establishment of U.S.–Syria diplomatic relations. He was concurrently commissioned to Lebanon and Syria, while resident in Beirut.
Egypt and Syria united to form a new state, the United Arab Republic (UAR) in 1958. The U.S. recognized the UAR immediately. The American Embassy in Damascus was reclassified as a Consulate General. Syria seceded from the Union in 1961 and U.S.–Syria diplomatic relations were reestablished.
Syria severed diplomatic relations with the U.S. on June 6, 1967 in the wake of the 1967 Arab-Israeli War. Normal relations were resumed in 1974.
The U.S. recalled its ambassador to Syria in 2005 after the assassination of Rafic Hariri. A series of chargés d’affaires represented the U.S. until the appointment of Robert Stephen Ford in January 2011.TajikistanConsulate:
Recognized: 1991
Relations established: 1992
Legation/embassy established: 1992
First ambassador: Stanley Tuemler Escudero
Relations ended: —
Notes:
After the 1998 United States embassy bombings in Africa, diplomatic personnel at embassy Dushanbe were temporarily relocated to Almaty, Kazakhstan, due to heightened embassy security standards. The embassy was later reopened.TanzaniaConsulate:
Recognized: 1961
Relations established: 1961
Legation/embassy established: 1961
First ambassador: William Leonhart
Relations ended: —
Notes:
Ambassador Leonhart was originally commissioned to Tanganyika. He continued to serve as ambassador to Tanzania after the union of Tanganyika and Zanzibar in 1964.TexasConsulate: 1830
Recognized: 1837
Relations established: 1837
Legation/embassy established: 1837
First ambassador: Alcée Louis la Branche
Relations ended: 1846
Notes:
A series of six chargés d’affaires represented the U. S government to the Republic of Texas. No ranking minister was appointed.
Texas was annexed to the U.S. in 1846 and ceased to exist as a sovereign state.ThailandConsulate: 1859
Recognized: 1833
Relations established: 1882
Legation/embassy established: 1882
First ambassador: John A. Halderman
Relations ended: —
Notes:
U.S.–Thailand diplomatic relations were interrupted in 1942 when Thailand declared war on the U.S. during the Japanese occupation. The U.S. embassy was closed. Normal relations were restored in 1946.Timor-LesteConsulate:
Recognized: 2002
Relations established: 2002
Legation/embassy established: 2002
First ambassador: Grover Rees, III
Relations ended: —TogoConsulate:
Recognized: 1960
Relations established: 1960
Legation/embassy established: 1960
First ambassador: Leland Barrows
Relations ended: —Tonga (1)
Consulate: 1897
Recognized: 1886
Relations established: —
Legation/embassy established: —
First ambassador: —
Relations ended: 1900
Notes:
Tonga had been a sovereign state since 1845, but became a British protectorate in 1900. While Tonga remained independent, the British Foreign Office would maintain sole control of all foreign relations of Tonga. The protectorate ended in 1970.Tonga (2)
Consulate:
Recognized: 1972
Relations established: 1972
Legation/embassy established: —
First ambassador: Kenneth Franzheim II
Relations ended: —
Notes:
The British protectorate of Tonga ended in 1970 and Tonga became an independent and sovereign state.
Franzheim was the U.S. ambassador to New Zealand and was concurrently commissioned to Fiji, Tonga, and Western Samoa, while resident in Wellington, New Zealand. In 1979 the ambassador to Fiji assumed the commission to Fiji, Kiribati, Nauru, and Tuvalu, while resident in Suva, Fiji.Trinidad and TobagoConsulate:
Recognized: 1962
Relations established: 1962
Legation/embassy established: 1962
First ambassador: Robert G. Miner
Relations ended: —TunisiaConsulate: 1795
Recognized: 1956
Relations established: 1956
Legation/embassy established: 1956
First ambassador: George Lewis Jones
Relations ended: —TurkeyConsulate:
Recognized: 1830
Relations established: 1831
Legation/embassy established: 1831
First ambassador: David Porter
Relations ended: —
Notes:
Turkey severed diplomatic relations with the United States in 1917 after the United States declared war against Germany. Relations were reestablished in 1927.TurkmenistanConsulate:
Recognized: 1991
Relations established: 1992
Legation/embassy established: 1992
First ambassador: Joseph S. Hulings
Relations ended: —TuvaluConsulate:
Recognized: 1978
Relations established: 1979
Legation/embassy established: —
First ambassador: John Peter Condon
Relations ended: —
Notes:
The U.S. ambassador to Tuvalu is concurrently commissioned to Fiji, Kiribati, Nauru, and Tonga, while resident in Suva, Fiji. There is no U.S. embassy in Tuvalu.Tuscany, Grand Duchy ofConsulate: 1794
Recognized: 1817
Relations established: —
Legation/embassy established: —
First ambassador: —
Relations ended: 1861
Notes:
The Grand Duchy of Tuscany recognized the U.S. in 1794 and received a U.S. Consul. The U.S. government received a consul from the Grand Duchy in 1817, which constituted de facto recognition. The U.S. and the Grand Duchy never established formal diplomatic relations.
The Grand Duchy of Tuscany was absorbed into the Kingdom of Italy in 1861 and ceased to exist as a sovereign state.Two Sicilies, Kingdom of theConsulate: 1796
Recognized: 1796
Relations established: 1832
Legation/embassy established: 1832
First ambassador: Robert Dale Owen (1854)
Relations ended: 1861
Notes:
Initial recognition between the U.S. and the Kingdom was made with the Kingdom of Naples. The Kingdom of Naples joined with the Kingdom of Sicily in 1816 to become the Kingdom of the Two Sicilies.
 A series of chargés d’affaires represented the U.S. to the Kingdom until the first ranking minister was appointed in 1854.
The Kingdom of the Two Sicilies was absorbed into the Kingdom of Sardinia in 1860 and then into the Kingdom of Italy in 1861 and ceased to exist as a sovereign state. The U.S. legation in Naples was closed in 1860. The U.S. recognized the Kingdom of Italy in 1861.UgandaConsulate:
Recognized: 1961
Relations established: 1962
Legation/embassy established: 1962
First ambassador: Olcott Deming
Relations ended: —
Notes:
The U.S. embassy in Kampala was closed and all personnel were withdrawn in 1973 due to security concerns. In 1979 the embassy was reopened and a new ambassador was appointed in 1979.UkraineConsulate:
Recognized: 1991
Relations established: 1991
Legation/embassy established: 1992
First ambassador: Roman Popadiuk
Relations ended: —Union of Soviet Socialist Republics (USSR) – see RussiaUnited Arab EmiratesConsulate:
Recognized: 1971
Relations established: 1972
Legation/embassy established: 1974
First ambassador: William Stoltzfus
Relations ended: —
Notes:
The first ambassador was concurrently accredited to Bahrain, Kuwait, Oman, Qatar, and the UAE, while resident at Kuwait. The first ambassador commissioned solely to the UAE was Michael Edmund Sterner in 1974.United KingdomConsulate: 1798
Recognized: 1783
Relations established: 1785
Legation/embassy established: 1785
First ambassador: John Adams
Relations ended: —
Notes:
Minister Adams was concurrently commissioned to the U. K. and the Netherlands, while resident in London.
Adams became so frustrated with the cool reception at the court in London that he closed the legation in 1788 and the post remained vacant for four years. The next ambassador was appointed in 1792.
The U.S. severed diplomatic relations with the U. K. when it declared war against its former colonial ruler on June 18, 1812. Normal relations were restored in 1815 with the appointment of minister John Quincy Adams.UruguayConsulate:
Recognized: 1836
Relations established: 1867
Legation/embassy established: 1870
First ambassador: Alexander Asboth
Relations ended: —
Notes:
Ambassador Asboth was concurrently commissioned to Argentina and Uruguay, while resident at Buenos Aires.UzbekistanConsulate:
Recognized: 1991
Relations established: 1991
Legation/embassy established: 1992
First ambassador: Henry Lee Clarke
Relations ended: —VanuatuConsulate:
Recognized: 1980
Relations established: 1986
Legation/embassy established: —
First ambassador: Everett E. Bierman
Relations ended: —
Notes:
The U.S. Ambassador to Papua New Guinea is concurrently accredited to the Solomon Islands and Vanuatu, while resident in Port Moresby, Papua New Guinea.VenezuelaConsulate: 1824
Recognized: 1835
Relations established: 1835
Legation/embassy established: 1835
First ambassador: Charles Eames (1854)
Relations ended: —
Notes:
The U.S. had previously recognized Venezuela as a part of Gran Colombia in 1822. Venezuela was recognized separately in 1835 after the federation broke apart in 1831.
A series of chargés d’affaires represented the U.S. until 1854 when the first ranking minister, Charles Eames, was appointed.
The U.S. severed diplomatic relations with Venezuela in 1908. Relations were resumed in 1909.
In 2008 Venezuela declared the U.S. Ambassador persona non grata and expelled him. The U.S. reciprocated by expelling the Venezuelan ambassador. Since that time, Venezuela has refused to accept Larry Palmer as the new ambassador.Vietnam (1)
Consulate: 1907
Recognized: 1950
Relations established: 1950
Legation/embassy established: 1950
First ambassador: Donald R. Heath
Relations ended: 1954
Notes:
The U.S. recognized the State of Vietnam in 1950, which claimed authority over all of Vietnam. When Vietnam was partitioned into North and South in 1954, The U.S. recognized South Vietnam  but did not recognize the communist government of North Vietnam under Ho Chi Minh. The U.S. maintained its embassy in Saigon.
Ambassador Heath was concurrently commissioned to Vietnam and Laos, while resident at Saigon. The first resident ambassador was Charles Woodruff Yost in 1954.Vietnam (2)
Consulate:
Recognized: 1995
Relations established: 1995
Legation/embassy established: 1995
First ambassador: Pete Peterson
Relations ended: —
Notes:
A U.S. Liaison Office was opened in Hanoi in 1995 and the first ranking ambassador was appointed in 1997.Vietnam, SouthConsulate:
Recognized: 1950
Relations established: 1950
Legation/embassy established: 1950
First ambassador: Donald R. Heath
Relations ended: 1975
Notes:
The U.S. embassy in Saigon was closed and all personnel evacuated April 29, 1975, the day before the Fall of Saigon.Württemberg, Kingdom ofConsulate: 1842
Recognized: 1825
Relations established: —
Legation/embassy established: —
First ambassador: —
Relations ended: 1871
Notes:
U.S. Ambassador to Prussia George Bancroft was given special accreditation to the Kingdom of Württemberg but is not listed as official minister.
In 1871 Württemberg became a member of the new German Empire and ceased to exist as a sovereign state.Yemen, NorthConsulate:
Recognized: 1946
Relations established: 1946
Legation/embassy established: 1959
First ambassador: James Rives Childs (1946)
Relations ended: 1990
Notes:
The U.S. recognized the Mutawakkilite Kingdom of Yemen in 1946. The U.S. again recognized the government when it became the Yemen Arab Republic following a coup d’état in 1962.
Ambassador Childs was concurrently accredited to Saudi Arabia and the Kingdom of Yemen, while resident at Jeddah. The first ambassador solely accredited to North Yemen was Donald R. Heath in 1957. However, Heath did not present his credentials, so he was not officially the ambassador. The next official ambassador was Raymond A. Hare in 1959.
In 1966 the U.S. embassy was moved from Ta'izz to Sana'a.
1962–1967, during a period of civil war in North Yemen, there was no ambassador commissioned to the Yemen Arab Republic. A series of chargés d’affaires represented the U.S.
The Yemen Arab Republic (North Yemen) severed relations with the United States on June 7, 1967 in the wake of the Arab-Israeli Six-Day War. Normal relations were reestablished in 1972 and the embassy was reopened.
In 1990, the Yemen Arab Republic (North Yemen) and the People's Democratic Republic of Yemen (South Yemen) united to form the Republic of Yemen.Yemen, SouthConsulate:
Recognized: 1967
Relations established: 1967
Legation/embassy established: 1967
First ambassador: —
Relations ended: 1990
Notes:
The People's Democratic Republic of Yemen (South Yemen) severed diplomatic relations with the United States on October 24, 1969. William L. Eagleton was the first and last chargé d’affaires at the embassy at Aden. No ambassador had been appointed when relations were severed. Relations were resumed briefly in April 1990 and ended in May 1990 when North and South Yemen joined to form the Republic of Yemen. The embassy in Aden was never reopened.
In 1990, the Yemen Arab Republic (North Yemen) and the People's Democratic Republic of Yemen (South Yemen) united to form the Republic of Yemen.Yemen (Republic of Yemen)Consulate:
Recognized: 1990
Relations established: 1990
Legation/embassy established: 1990
First ambassador: Charles Franklin Dunbar
Relations ended: —
Notes:
In 1990, the Republic of Yemen was formed by the union of the Yemen Arab Republic (North Yemen) and the People's Democratic Republic of Yemen (South Yemen).
Ambassador Dunbar had been the ambassador to North Yemen and continued as ambassador to united Republic of Yemen.Yugoslavia – see SerbiaZambiaConsulate:
Recognized: 1964
Relations established: 1964
Legation/embassy established: 1964
First ambassador: Robert Crocker Good (1965)
Relations ended: —Zimbabwe'''
Consulate:
Recognized: 1980
Relations established: 1980
Legation/embassy established: 1980
First ambassador: Robert V. Keeley
Relations ended: —
Notes:
The U.S. never recognized Rhodesia, nor Zimbabwe Rhodesia, the predecessor states to Zimbabwe.

See also
Ambassadors of the United States
Timeline of United States diplomatic history

References